The saucereye porgy (Calamus calamus) is an ocean-going species of fish in the family Sparidae. In Bermuda, they are also known as the goat's head porgy. In Jamaica, they are known as the Porgi grunt and the sugareye porgy. They may also be known simply by the name Porgy in several other Caribbean islands. Saucereye porgies are considered to be minor gamefishes and when caught are marketed both fresh and frozen.

Taxonomy and naming 
The Saucereye porgy was first described by the French zoologist, Achille Valenciennes in a 22-volume work entitled Histoire naturelle des poissons (Natural History of Fishes), which was a collaboration with fellow zoologist, Georges Cuvier. It was first described as Pagellus calamus, being placed in the genus Pagellus. It was since moved into Calamus, a genus named for the mythological Calamus, or Kalamos. It was so named because the Calamus of myth allowed himself to drown in a river, after the death of his lover, and transform into aquatic plants that young saucereye porgies make their homes in.

Description 
Saucereye porgies can grow up to 56 cm in length, but normally they are 30 to 45 cm long. Though some sources state that they can weigh up to 3 lbs, the largest record is only half that: 1.5 lbs. The cheek area is blue with yellow spots; there is also a dark blue smudge behind the upper gill opening.

Distribution and habitat 

Saucereyes are found only in the western Atlantic ocean—from North Carolina, east to Bermuda, and south to Brazil. They are most common around the cities of Key West and Havana. Adults are commonly found around coral reefs, where they are easily approached by divers, while juveniles are common to beds of sea grass (mainly Thalassia). Saucereyes feed on a variety of animals, such as mollusks, sea worms, brittle stars, hermit crabs, crabs and sea urchins.

Relationship with Humans
The Saurcereye porgy is mostly eaten by people in the West Indies, where it is most often caught. These fishes are also considered to be of minor commercial importance to the region, despite the occasional danger of ciguatera poisoning during red tide events. They are usually marketed fresh or frozen.

References

External links 
 Saucereye porgy at Fishbase
 

saucereye porgy
Fauna of the Southeastern United States
Fish of the Western Atlantic
Sport fish
saucereye porgy